David G. Perry (born July 31, 1952, in Oak Hill, West Virginia) is an American politician and a Democratic member of the West Virginia House of Delegates representing District 32 since January 12, 2013. Perry served consecutively from January 2001 until January 2013 in a District 29 seat.

Education
Perry earned his AS from Beckley Junior College and his BA and MA from Marshall University.

Elections
2012 Redistricted to District 32 alongside Democratic incumbent Representatives Margaret Anne Staggers and John Pino, Perry placed second in the seven-way May 8, 2012 Democratic Primary with 3,653 votes (21.1%), and placed second in the four-way three-position November 6, 2012 General election with 10,128 votes (29.9%), behind Representatives Staggers (D) and ahead of Representative Pino (D) and Mountain Party candidate Tighe Bullock.
2000 When House District 29 Representative William Laird IV left the Legislature and left a district seat open, Perry placed in the ten-way 2000 Democratic Primary and was elected in the four-way three-position November 7, 2000 General election alongside incumbent Representatives Tom Louisos (D) and John Pino (D).
2002 Perry placed in the five-way 2002 Democratic Primary and was re-elected in the five-way three-position November 5, 2002 General election with incumbents Louisos (D) and Pino (D).
2004 Perry placed in the seven-way 2004 Democratic Primary and was re-elected in the six-way three-position November 2, 2004 General election with incumbents Louisos (D) and Pino (D).
2006 Perry placed in the seven-way 2006 Democratic Primary where Representative Louisos was displaced by nominee Margaret Anne Staggers; Perry and was re-elected in the four-way three-position November 7, 2006 General election with incumbent Pino (D) and fellow Democratic nominee Margaret Anne Staggers.
2008 Perry placed second in the five-way May 13, 2008 Democratic Primary with 5,860 votes (22.4%) where former Representative Louisos displaced Representative Pino; Perry placed second in the six-way four-position November 4, 2008 General election with 9,227 votes (22.9%) behind former Representative Louisos and ahead of incumbent Representative Staggers and Republican nominees Marshall Clay, Daniel Wright, and Steven Smith.
2010 Perry placed second in the five-way May 11, 2010 Democratic Primary with 2,619 votes (23.4%), and placed second in the four-way three-position November 2, 2010 General election with 7,169 votes (27.5%) behind incumbent Staggers (D) and ahead of returning Representative Pino and returning 2008 Republican opponent Marshall Clay.

References

External links
Official page at the West Virginia Legislature

David Perry at Ballotpedia
David G. Perry at the National Institute on Money in State Politics

1952 births
Living people
Marshall University alumni
Democratic Party members of the West Virginia House of Delegates
People from Oak Hill, West Virginia
21st-century American politicians